Goodhart is a surname. Notable people with the surname include:

 Al Goodhart (1905–1955), American composer 
 Arthur Goodhart Altschul (1920–2002), American banker 
 Arthur Lehman Goodhart (1891–1978), American-born British academic jurist and lawyer
 Arthur M. Goodhart (1866–1941), British composer and organist
 Brian Goodhart (1913–2003), Australian rules footballer
 Charles Goodhart (born 1936), British economist, son of Arthur Lehman Goodhart
 David Goodhart (born 1956), British editor
 Harry Goodhart (1858–1895), English amateur footballer who became Professor of Humanities at the University of Edinburgh
 Harry Stuart Goodhart-Rendel (1887–1959), English architect and writer
 James Goodhart (1845–1916), English physician and paediatrician
 Nicholas Goodhart (1919–2011), British test pilot
 Philip Goodhart (1925–2015), British Conservative politician, son of Arthur Lehman Goodhart
 William Goodhart, Baron Goodhart (1933–2017), British Liberal Democrat politician and human rights lawyer, son of Arthur Lehman Goodhart

See also
Goodheart
Goodhart's law
Goodhart Newbury Manflier - a human-powered aircraft designed by Nicholas Goodhart